Bečov nad Teplou is a town in Karlovy Vary District in the Karlovy Vary Region of the Czech Republic. It has about 900 inhabitants. The town centre is well preserved and is protected by law as urban monument zone.

Administrative parts
Villages of Krásný Jez and Vodná are administrative parts of Bečov nad Teplou. Krásný Jez forms an exclave of the municipal territory.

Sights
Bečov nad Teplou is known for the complex of Bečov Castle and Bečov Chateau. The complex is open to the public. The exposition contains the second most valuable movable monument in the Czech Republic, the Reliquary of St. Maurus.

Notable people
August Labitzky (1832–1903), composer and kapellmeister

Gallery

References

External links

Cities and towns in the Czech Republic
Populated places in Karlovy Vary District